The 2009 South African Figure Skating Championships were held at The Ice Station in Cape Town from 18 to 19 August 2008. Skaters competed in the disciplines of men's and ladies' singles at the senior, novice, and pre-novice levels. There was also a junior and juvenile ladies' competition.

Senior results

Men

Ladies

Junior results

Ladies

Novice results

Men

Ladies

Pre-novice results

Boys

Girls

Juvenile results

Girls

External links
 2009 South African Championships results

South African Figure Skating Championships, 2009
South African Figure Skating Championships
Figure Skating Championships, 2009